Fowlea punctulata is a species of snake found in East India, Myanmar, and Thailand (Mae Hong Son Province).

References

 Günther, A. 1858 Catalogue of Colubrine snakes of the British Museum. London, I - XVI, 1 - 281
 Pauwels,O.S.G.;  David, P., Nutphand, W. & Chimsunchart, C. 2001 First record of Xenochrophis punctulatus (Günther 1858) (Serpentes: ColubridaNatricinae) from Thailand. Hamadryad 26 (2): 247-252

Fowlea
Reptiles described in 1858
Reptiles of Thailand
Reptiles of Myanmar
Reptiles of India
Taxa named by Albert Günther